Saba is an Afro-Asiatic language spoken in south central Chad. Speakers are found in Sorki canton in Chinguil sub-prefecture.

Ethnologue lists Jelkung as a synonym; Blench (2006), however, considers it a distinct language, in a different branch of East Chadic.

Notes

References
 Dakouli, Padeu, Antje Maass, and David Toomey. 1996. Rapid appraisal of the Saba language of the Guera, Chad. N’Djamena: Association SIL. Manuscript.
 

East Chadic languages
Languages of Chad